Nyamagasani II Hydroelectric Power Station, also 'Nyamagasani 2 Hydroelectric Power Station, is a  mini hydro power station, under construction in the  Western Region of Uganda.

Location
The power station is located near the village of Kyarumba, in Kaghema parish, Kyarumba sub-county, in Kasese District, in the foothills of the Rwenzori Mountains. Nyamagasani II Power Station lies close to and immediately downstream of its sister station Nyamagasani I Hydroelectric Power Station, which is under simultaneously development, by the same developers.

Overview
Nyamagasani II HEPS is a run-of-river mini-hydro power plant, whose planned installed capacity is 5 MW. The project company, Nyamagasani 2 HPP Limited, is majority-owned by DI Frontier Market Energy & Carbon Fund, a Denmark-based renewable energy investment company.

Timeline
The project received GetFit approval in June 2015, and financial close was achieved in 2016. Construction started in 2017. Completion was initially expected in the fourth quarter of 2018. As of June 2019, completion and commissioning were expected during the second half of 2019.

Funding
Construction is budgeted to cost US$19.8 million, with US$3.7 million in GetFit subsidies. This includes power generated from the adjacent Nyamagasi 1 Power station.

See also
Energy in Uganda
List of power stations in Uganda

References

External links
 Micro Dams To The Rescue
  

Kasese District
Hydroelectric power stations in Uganda